Hylogomphus is a genus of clubtails in the family of dragonflies known as Gomphidae. There are about six described species in Hylogomphus.

Hylogomphus was formerly considered a subgenus of Gomphus, but has recently been promoted to genus rank along with Phanogomphus, Stenogomphurus and Gomphurus.

Species
These six species belong to the genus Hylogomphus:
 Hylogomphus abbreviatus (Hagen in Selys, 1878) (spine-crowned clubtail)
 Hylogomphus adelphus (Selys, 1858) (mustached clubtail)
 Hylogomphus apomyius (Donnelly, 1966) (banner clubtail)
 Hylogomphus geminatus (Carle, 1979) (twin-striped clubtail)
 Hylogomphus parvidens (Currie, 1917) (Piedmont clubtail)
 Hylogomphus viridifrons (Hine, 1901) (green-faced clubtail)

References

Further reading

 
 
 
 
 
 
 

Gomphidae